The 12th Indian Cavalry Brigade was a cavalry brigade of the British Indian Army that formed part of the Indian Army during the First World War.  It remained in India throughout the war.

History
The 12th Indian Cavalry Brigade was formed under 4th (Quetta) Division in June 1918.  It took command of three newly formed cavalry regiments:
 40th Cavalry formed in April 1918 from
a squadron of 1st Duke of York's Own Lancers (Skinner's Horse)
"A" Squadron and two half squadrons of 3rd Skinner's Horse
another squadron
 41st Cavalry formed in April 1918 from
"F" Squadron, 26th King George's Own Light Cavalry
"F" Squadron, 39th King George's Own Central India Horse
a squadron of 15th Lancers (Cureton's Multanis)
a squadron of 37th Lancers (Baluch Horse)
 42nd Cavalry formed in April 1918 from
"F" Squadron, 35th Scinde Horse
a squadron from the depot of the 10th Duke of Cambridge's Own Lancers (Hodson's Horse)
two other squadrons
The brigade remained with the division throughout the First World War.  It was commanded from 27 June 1918 by Brigadier-General H.B. Birdwood.  All three constituent regiments were disbanded in 1921.

See also

 12th Cavalry Brigade (British Indian Army) existed at the same time but was unrelated other than having the same number

Notes

References

Bibliography

External links

C12
Cavalry brigades of the British Indian Army
Military units and formations established in 1918